Haedropleura ryalli is a species of sea snail, a marine gastropod mollusk in the family Horaiclavidae.

Description

Distribution
This marine species occurs in the Gulf of Guinea off São Tomé island.

References

 Horro J., Gori S. & Rolán E. (2010). Haedropleura ryalli, a new species from São Tomé island (Gastropoda, Turridae). Iberus 28(2): 1–4

ryalli
Gastropods described in 2010
Invertebrates of São Tomé and Príncipe
Fauna of São Tomé Island